The 2009 Madrid Open (also known as the Mutua Madrileña Madrid Open for sponsorship reasons) was a tennis tournament played on outdoor clay courts. It was the eighth edition of the Madrid Masters on the ATP and first on the WTA. It was classified as an ATP World Tour Masters 1000 event on the 2009 ATP World Tour and a Premier Mandatory event on the 2009 WTA Tour. Both the men's and the women's events took place at the Park Manzanares in Madrid, Spain from 9 May until 17 May 2009.

2009 was the first year that the Madrid Masters was played on clay rather than a hard-court surface, which replaced Hamburg Masters (for men) that was now downgraded into an ATP 500 tournament and Berlin (for women) which was now defunct.

ATP entrants

Seeds

Seedings based on the May 4, 2009 rankings.

Other entrants
The following players received wildcards into the main draw:
  Juan Mónaco
  Juan Carlos Ferrero
  Óscar Hernández
  Ivan Ljubičić

The following players received entry from the qualifying draw:
  Teymuraz Gabashvili
  Juan Ignacio Chela
  Tommy Haas
  Marco Crugnola
  Guillermo Cañas
  Eduardo Schwank
  Fabio Fognini

The following players received entry into lucky losers:
  Guillermo García López
  Iván Navarro

WTA entrants

Seeds

Seedings based on the May 4, 2009 rankings.

Other entrants
The following players received wildcards into the main draw:
  Virginia Ruano Pascual
  Nuria Llagostera Vives
  Lourdes Domínguez Lino
  Sílvia Soler Espinosa

The following players received entry from the qualifying draw:
  Roberta Vinci
  Elena Vesnina
  Mariana Duque Marino
  Aravane Rezaï
  Varvara Lepchenko
  Akgul Amanmuradova
  Vera Dushevina
  Anna-Lena Grönefeld

Finals

Men's singles

 Roger Federer defeated  Rafael Nadal 6–4, 6–4
 It was Federer's first title of the year and the 58th title of his career.

Women's singles

 Dinara Safina defeated  Caroline Wozniacki 6–2, 6–4
 It was Safina's second title of the year and 11th of her career.

Men's doubles

 Daniel Nestor /  Nenad Zimonjić defeated  Simon Aspelin /  Wesley Moodie  6–4, 6–4

Women's doubles

 Cara Black /  Liezel Huber defeated  Květa Peschke /  Lisa Raymond 4–6, 6–3, 10–6

External links
 Official website

References

 
2009 ATP World Tour
2009 WTA Tour